Jason Anthony Ho-Shue (born 29 August 1998) is a Canadian badminton player. He won the gold medal in the men's doubles at the 2019 Pan American Games, and at the Pan Am Championships in 2016, 2017, 2018 and 2019. He also won the men's singles title at the Pan Am Championships in 2016.

Career
In 2015, he settled triple crowns at the Pan Am Junior Badminton Championships in boys' singles, doubles, and mixed doubles event. In the mixed team event, he won the bronze medal. In 2016, he became the youngest Canadian badminton player who won the national title in men's singles event. He also won double titles at the XX Pan Am Individual Championships in men's singles and doubles event. He represented his country competed at the 2018 Commonwealth Games in Gold Coast. He was a gold medalist in the men's doubles event partnered with Nyl Yakura at the 2019 Lima Pan American Games, also won a bronze medal in the men's singles.

In June 2021, Ho-Shue was named to Canada's Olympic team for the 2020 Summer Olympics. Partnered with Nyl Yakura, he was eliminated in the group stage.

Achievements

Pan American Games 
Men's singles

Men's doubles

Pan Am Championships 
Men's singles

Men's doubles

Pan Am Junior Championships 
Boys' singles

Boys' doubles

Mixed doubles

BWF International Challenge/Series (5 titles, 3 runners-up) 
Men's singles

Men's doubles

  BWF International Challenge tournament
  BWF International Series tournament
  BWF Future Series tournament

References

External links 
 
 
 

Living people
1998 births
Sportspeople from Markham, Ontario
Canadian male badminton players
Badminton players at the 2020 Summer Olympics
Olympic badminton players of Canada
Badminton players at the 2018 Commonwealth Games
Commonwealth Games competitors for Canada
Badminton players at the 2019 Pan American Games
Pan American Games gold medalists for Canada
Pan American Games bronze medalists for Canada
Pan American Games medalists in badminton
Medalists at the 2019 Pan American Games